Marinomonas ostreistagni is a Gram-negative, aerobic, rod-shaped, halophilic and neutrophilic bacterium from the genus of Marinomonas which has been isolated from a pond which was cultivated with pearl oyster in Sanya in China.

References

Oceanospirillales
Bacteria described in 2006